Prospect Hill is a mountain in Barnstable County, Massachusetts. German Hill is located east of Prospect Hill.

References

Mountains of Massachusetts
Mountains of Barnstable County, Massachusetts